Scarleth Ucelo (born 7 April 2000) is a Guatemalan weightlifter. She represented Guatemala at the 2020 Summer Olympics in Tokyo, Japan. She finished in 13th place in the women's +87 kg event.

In 2019, she finished in 5th place in the women's +87 kg event at the Pan American Games held in Lima, Peru.

She competed in the women's +87 kg event at the 2021 World Weightlifting Championships held in Tashkent, Uzbekistan.

Major results

References

External links 
 

Living people
2000 births
Guatemalan female weightlifters
Weightlifters at the 2019 Pan American Games
Pan American Games competitors for Guatemala
Weightlifters at the 2020 Summer Olympics
Olympic weightlifters of Guatemala
People from Jalapa Department
21st-century Guatemalan women